Reford may refer to:

Places
 Rural Municipality of Reford No. 379, Saskatchewan, Canada
 Jardins de Métis, Quebec, Canada, known in English as "Reford Gardens"

People
 Reford MacDougall, president of the St. Andrew's Society of Montreal
 Alexander Reford, Canadian historian; great-great-grandson of Robert Reford Sr.
 Elsie Reford, Canadian horticulturist, namesake of the Reford Gardens, and wife to the younger Robert Reford
 Lewis Reford, candidate for the Conservative Party of Canada in the 2006 Canadian federal election
 Robert Wilson Reford Sr., Canadian businessman and philanthropist 
 Robert Wilson Reford Jr., son of Robert Reford Sr.

See also

 
 Wreford (disambiguation)
 Radford (disambiguation)
 Redford (disambiguation)
 Ford (disambiguation)